ru:Острова-«спутники» Шикотана
The Offshore islets of Shikotan include several tiny islets and rocks scattered around the coast of Shikotan island, which in turn is a part of Lesser Kuril Chain in Sakhalin Oblast of Russia. The islets are claimed by Japan together with Shikotan as parts of the nominal .

History 
In 1855 the islets together with Shikotan were incorporated into Empire of Japan on conditions of Treaty of Shimoda.

After World War II the islets have become part of the USSR and then Russia. Though some of them used to have Japanese names they mostly remained unnamed in Russia until after the Russian Geographical Society made an expedition to the area in 2012; a further five were given Russian names in 2017.

References 

Islands of the Kuril Islands